"All Is on My Side" is a song performed by English musician Sam Fender. The song was released as a digital download on 10 December 2019. The song was written by Sam Fender and produced by Bramwell Bronte.

Background
Fender performed the song during his live shows, but decided to release the song as a single after fans campaigned for the song's release. On his Twitter account, he said, "This is one of the oldest songs I have, it didn’t make the album. I’ve played it for 5 years and wrote it when I was a baby." He also said in a press release, "‘All Is On My Side’ is a real live favourite for me. It’s been a mainstay in the set for a couple of years now and it’s nice to release this as a bit of a thank you to all the fans at the end of the year."

Music video
A music video to accompany the release of "All Is On My Side" was first released onto YouTube on 10 December 2019. The music video was directed by Jack Whitefield, when talking about the video, he said, "The film was shot entirely on 16mm and 8mm film stock then edited partially by hand using a 1979 Steenbeck editing table. This allowed me to choose specific scenes, remove them from the reel of film and deface them with scratches, tape, holes, and create hand made transitions between scenes."

Charts

Release history

References

2019 songs
Sam Fender songs
Polydor Records singles